Southern Denkalya Subregion is a subregion in the Southern Red Sea region (Zoba Debubawi Keyih Bahri) of Eritrea.

References

Subregions of Eritrea

Southern Red Sea Region
Subregions of Eritrea